Strange Report is a British television crime drama series starring Anthony Quayle as Adam Strange. It was produced by ITC Entertainment and first broadcast in 1969 on ITV

In the United States, NBC broadcast Strange Report between 8 January and 10 September 1971. It aired on Fridays from 10:00 to 11:00 p.m. Eastern Time throughout its American run.

Plot
Adam Strange, a retired Home Office criminologist, solves bizarre cases with the help of Hamlyn Gynt (Kaz Garas), Evelyn McClean (Anneke Wills) and sometimes Professor Marks (Charles Lloyd-Pack). He employs the latest techniques in forensic investigation, which he undertakes in his own laboratory in his flat in Warwick Crescent in the Maida Vale/Little Venice area of London.

Cast

Anthony Quayle as Adam Strange
Kaz Garas as Hamlyn Gynt
Anneke Wills as Evelyn McClean

Production

Development
Unlike other ITC productions, which were created in order to be sold to the U.S. market, Strange Report was created in collaboration with NBC's films unit Arena in the United States (the show's executive producer was Norman Felton, better known for his involvement in The Man from U.N.C.L.E.); the suggestion was that the first half of the series would take place in the United Kingdom, and the second half would see Strange visiting the United States. This idea could not be agreed upon, which explains why such a short season of episodes was created. Quayle and Wills decided not to continue with the series, owing to personal concerns.

Music
The series's opening theme, composed by Roger Webb, was also available as sheet music.

Filming
It was filmed between July 1968 and March 1969, on location and at Pinewood Studios, Iver Heath, Buckinghamshire.

Episodes
Airdate is for ATV Midlands. ITV regions varied date and order.

Broadcast
The series was repeated on UK satellite channel Bravo in 1996/1997, and on UK digital terrestrial channel ITV4, from digitally restored prints, in 2005/2006. (The episode 'Heart' was not screened by ITV4.) Satellite channel Men and Motors also screened the series in 2007.

Home media
Techno Film released two episodes – "SHRAPNEL" and "HOSTAGE" – on Super 8 cine film for home use in 1970.

ITC Video released two VHS tapes of the series in the UK in 1994, containing the episodes – 'Heart'/'X-Ray', and 'Covergirls'/'Cult'.

The series was digitally restored for Carlton Visual Entertainment by BBC Resources in 2003. The full series was released on DVD in the UK by the Network imprint as a five-disc special edition in 2004 and as a four-disc edition in 2005. The special edition was subsequently re-released in the UK in 2007 and the regular one in 2009. The series was also released on DVD in Australia by Umbrella Entertainment in 2007. In 2011, Network re-released the episode 'Kidnap' in its retro-ACTION! Volume 1 Blu-Ray, this is the first time an episode of the series had been shown in a superior high-definition quality. The same episode was further released in Network's 2018 retro-ACTION! Blu-Ray.

In other media

Books
A paperback novel "based on the famous TV series" and written by John Burke was published by Hodder & Stoughton in 1970.

Records
The theme to the series by Roger Webb was released as a 7 inch single on Columbia records (DB 8803) in 1971. "The World of Love", the song from the episode 'Cult', was released as the B-side of The Strangers' first single, "I've Got You", on the little-known Harvard record label (Harv 001) in 1970. The accompaniment to the song is credited to Geoff Love who, in 1972, recorded his own version of the Strange Report theme for the Music For Pleasure LP Geoff Love and his Orchestra Play Your Top TV Themes (MFP 5272). This version can also be found on the Virgin Records CDs This Is Easy (1996) and This is....Cult Fiction Royale (1997), and the ITV 50 Cult TV Themes CD (2005) released to celebrate 50 years of ITV.

In 2009, Network issued a soundtrack album containing Webb's theme music and original scores composed for the episodes "REPORT 4407: HEART – No Choice for the Donor", "REPORT 1553: RACIST – A Most Dangerous Proposal", "REPORT 0649: SKELETON – Let Sleeping Heroes Lie", "REPORT 5055: CULT – Murder Shrieks Out", "REPORT 7931: SNIPER – When is Your Cousin Not?" and "REPORT 3424: EPIDEMIC – A Most Curious Crime", as well as unused and alternate takes, plus library music from other composers also used in the series.

Note: 'The Strangers' mentioned here should not be confused with either the Australian or Irish groups of the same name.

References

External links

1960s British drama television series
1969 British television series debuts
1970 British television series endings
Television series by ITC Entertainment
ITV television dramas
NBC original programming
Television series produced at Pinewood Studios
English-language television shows
Television shows set in London